Vivendi Games was an American video game publisher and holding company based in Los Angeles. It was founded in 1996 as CUC Software, the publishing subsidiary of CUC International, after the latter acquired video game companies Davidson & Associates and Sierra On-Line. Between 1997 and 2001, the company switched parents and names multiple times before ending up organized under Vivendi Universal (later renamed Vivendi). On July 10, 2008, Vivendi Games merged with Activision to create Activision Blizzard.

History

CUC/Cendant 
On February 21, 1996, CUC International announced its intention to acquire Davidson & Associates (including Blizzard Entertainment) and Sierra On-Line, two American video game companies, in a  stock swap. The deal closed on July 24, 1996. CUC International previously only operated membership shopping clubs, wherefore analysts were surprised by the company's move into the software industry.

Subsequently, following the acquisitions, CUC International established CUC Software around the Torrance, California-based operations of Davidson & Associates to oversee the new video game properties. Under that new umbrella, both Davidson & Associates and Sierra On-Line would act independently from CUC International. Bod Davidson, co-founder of Davidson & Associates, became chairman and chief executive of the new establishment. The acquisition was completed on February 3, 1997. On February 10, Davidson announced that he had stepped down from his positions at CUC Software, and that his wife, Jan, ceased as president of Davidson & Associates, while both Davidsons stayed on CUC International's board of directors. Christopher McLeod, an executive vice-president for CUC International, took over CUC Software in Bob Davidson's place. In April 1997, CUC International acquired Berkeley Systems for an undisclosed sum.

On May 28, 1997, CUC International announced plans to merge with Hospitality Franchise Systems to create a single, "one-stop" entity. The merger was finalized in December that year and created Cendant. As a result of the merger, CUC Software was renamed Cendant Software.

Havas/Vivendi 
Subsequently, the division was renamed Havas Interactive.

On May 16, 2001, Havas Interactive was renamed Vivendi Universal Interactive Publishing, while Havas itself became Vivendi Universal Publishing. The new name was likely due to the merger between Universal and Vivendi; the company also received ownership of properties from Universal Interactive Studios. Under the new name, the company was split into two parts: Vivendi Universal Interactive Publishing North America and Vivendi Universal Interactive Publishing International, both of which took responsibility for their respective publishing regions. On November 13, 2001, both parts were streamlined under the name Vivendi Universal Games.

When Vivendi Universal sold all of its media operations to General Electric in October 2003, Vivendi Universal held on to Vivendi Universal Games, which was re-organized as a direct division of the conglomerate. On March 3, 2006, with the sale completed, Vivendi Universal announced they would be dropping the "Universal" part of their name. The same day, the company opened a mobile games division known as Vivendi Universal Games Mobile.

Merger with Activision 
In December 2007, American publisher Activision announced a proposed merger deal with Vivendi Games that would create a new holding company named Activision Blizzard. The deal was approved by Activision's shareholders on July 8, 2008, and the merger was finalized on July 10, creating Activision Blizzard while dissolving Vivendi Games. Bruce Hack, who served as chief executive officer of Vivendi Games, became vice-chairman and chief corporate officer of the new company. Many of Vivendi Games' properties were later dropped by Activision, citing that they would not make for a good fit for the company's long-term strategy.

Subsidiaries

Publishers

Former

Developers

Former

Games

Notes

References 

1996 establishments in California
2008 disestablishments in California
2008 mergers and acquisitions
Activision Blizzard
American companies established in 1996
Companies based in Los Angeles County, California
Defunct companies based in Greater Los Angeles
Defunct video game companies of the United States
Games
Holding companies of the United States
Technology companies based in Greater Los Angeles
Video game companies based in California
Video game companies disestablished in 2008
Video game companies established in 1996
Video game publishers